Stenidea affinis is a species of beetle in the family Cerambycidae. It was described by Fairmaire in 1894. It is known from Kenya, Ethiopia and Tanzania.

References

affinis
Beetles described in 1894